Jason Cipolla (born May 11, 1974) is a retired  American basketball player.

High school
While living in Woodhaven, Queens Jason Cipolla attended Christ the King Regional High School in the neighborhood of Middle Village, Queens in New York City.

College
Following high school, Cipolla attended Tallahassee Community College for two years earning an Associate degree.  While playing basketball Cipolla earned two first-team All-Panhandle Conference awards and in just two seasons he ranks third in scoring and first in scoring average.  In 1996 Cipolla transferred to Syracuse University.  In two seasons with Syracuse Orangemen Cipolla started 56 of 69 games.  During his junior year Cipolla's team reached the finals of the 1996 NCAA Men's Division I Basketball Tournament losing to the University of Kentucky.  In the losing effort Cipolla tied the title game record of four steals.  His most tournament memorable moment was while in a sweet sixteen matchup against the University of Georgia, he hit a 16-foot fade away jump shot to tie the game as time expired.  He also was named third-team All-Big East.

References

External links

1974 births
Living people
American men's basketball players
Basketball players from New York City
People from Woodhaven, Queens
Shooting guards
Sportspeople from Queens, New York
Syracuse Orange men's basketball players
Tallahassee Eagles men's basketball players